Event Horizon is a 1997 science fiction horror film directed by Paul W. S. Anderson and written by Philip Eisner. It stars Laurence Fishburne, Sam Neill, Kathleen Quinlan and Joely Richardson. Set in 2047, it follows a crew of astronauts sent on a rescue mission after a missing spaceship, the Event Horizon, spontaneously appears in orbit around Neptune, only to discover that a sinister force has come back with it.

The film had a troubled production, with filming and editing rushed by Paramount when it became clear that Titanic would not meet its projected release. The original 130-minute cut of the film was heavily edited by the studio's demand, to Anderson's consternation.

On release, the film was a commercial and critical failure, grossing $42 million on a $60 million production budget. However, it began to sell well on home video; its initial DVD release sold so well that Paramount contacted Anderson to begin working on a restoration of the deleted footage, but it had been either lost or destroyed. In the years since, the film has slowly built a cult following and is referenced in other works of popular culture.

Plot
In 2047, a distress signal is received from the Event Horizon, a starship that disappeared during its maiden voyage to Proxima Centauri seven years earlier. The ship mysteriously reappears in a decaying orbit around Neptune, and the rescue vessel Lewis and Clark is dispatched to investigate. Its crew—Capt. Miller, second-in-command Lt. Starck, pilot Smith, medical technician Peters, engineer Ensign Justin, doctor D.J., and rescue technician Cooper—is joined by Dr. William Weir, the Event Horizons designer. He briefs them on the ship's experimental gravity drive with a simple visualization of how it folds space-time. The distress signal consists of a series of screams and howls but D.J. believes he hears the Latin phrase  ("Save me").

Upon boarding the Event Horizon the crew finds evidence of a massacre. As they search for survivors, the ship's gravity drive activates and briefly pulls Justin into a portal while also causing a shock wave that damages the Lewis and Clark. The crew are all forced to board the Event Horizon while Justin emerges in a catatonic state. He attempts suicide by decompression, but is saved by Miller, forcing the crew to place Justin in stasis. Smith and Cooper are sent on a spacewalk to repair the hull of the Lewis and Clark.

The crew begins having hallucinations corresponding to their fears and regrets. Miller sees a subordinate he was forced to abandon to his death; Peters sees her son with his legs covered in bloody lesions; Weir sees an eyeless vision of his late wife urging him to join her. They discover a video log of the Event Horizons crew fornicating and mutilating each other shortly after first engaging the gravity drive. The log ends with a shot of the Event Horizons captain, holding his own eyes gouged from their sockets and speaking the Latin phrase from the earlier distress call.

Weir explains that the ship's drive opened a gateway to a hellish dimension outside the known universe, and that the Event Horizon has attained sentience. Miller decides to destroy it and orders an evacuation while Peters is lured to her death by a hallucination of her son. Weir, who has gouged out his own eyes and is possessed by the evil presence, destroys the Lewis and Clark and kills Smith. Weir then kills D.J. by vivisecting him and corners Starck on the bridge. Miller confronts Weir, who overpowers him and initiates a 10-minute countdown to activate the gravity drive and return to the other dimension.

Cooper uses his space suit's oxygen supply to propel himself back to the ship and appears at the bridge window. Weir shoots at him, shattering the window, causing Weir to be sucked into space by the decompression. Miller, Starck, and Cooper survive and manage to seal off the ship's bridge. With their own ship destroyed, Miller plans to split the Event Horizon in two with explosives and use its forward section as a lifeboat. He is attacked by hallucinations which turn out to be the resurrected and further mutilated Weir. Miller fights him off and detonates the explosives, sacrificing himself.

The gravity drive activates, pulling the ship's stern section into a black hole. Starck and Cooper enter stasis beside a comatose Justin and wait to be rescued. Seventy-two days later, the wreckage of the Event Horizon is boarded by a rescue party who discover the survivors in stasis. Starck sees Weir posing as one of the rescuers and screams in terror, but wakes up and realizes that it was a nightmare. Cooper and the rescue team try to calm the terrified Starck as the doors close.

Cast

 Laurence Fishburne as Captain S.J. Miller, commanding officer of the Lewis and Clark.
 Sam Neill as Dr. William G. "Billy" Weir, designer of the Event Horizon.
 Kathleen Quinlan as Peters, medical technician of the Lewis and Clark.
 Joely Richardson as Lieutenant M.L. Starck, communications and executive officer of the Lewis and Clark.
 Richard T. Jones as T.F. Cooper, rescue technician of the Lewis and Clark.
 Jack Noseworthy as Ensign F.M. Justin, chief engineer of the Lewis and Clark.
 Jason Isaacs as D.J., medical doctor of the Lewis and Clark.
 Sean Pertwee as W.F. "Smitty" Smith, pilot of the Lewis and Clark.
  as Captain John Kilpack, commanding officer of the Event Horizon.
 Holley Chant as Claire Weir, Dr. Weir's wife.
 Barclay Wright as Denny Peters, Peters' son.
 Noah Huntley as Edmund Corrick, Miller's former shipmate from the Goliath.
 Robert Jezek as Rescue Technician, rescues the survivors of the Lewis and Clark.

Production

Development
After Mortal Kombat (1995) was a commercial success in the United States, English director Paul W. S. Anderson was inundated with screenplay offers, as well as the opportunity to direct the Mortal Kombat sequel Mortal Kombat: Annihilation (1997) and the upcoming X-Men (2000). He turned down the offers in favor of making an R-rated horror film, wanting to shift away from making another PG-13 film. Paramount Pictures sent him Philip Eisner's original script for Event Horizon, which they had been trying to develop with producers Lawrence Gordon and Lloyd Levin. According to Eisner, he first pitched its concept to Gordon as a "haunted house story in space", which the producer thought had potential: "Luckily", said Eisner, "he liked the idea enough to trust me to do it."

Anderson's initial reaction to the script, which involved the cruiseship Event Horizon experiencing a series of hauntings by "tentacular" aliens, it having crossed the threshold of their planet or "dimension", was that it bore striking resemblance to Alien (1979). Producer and longtime collaborator Jeremy Bolt felt it was a "terrific concept" but was "very dense" in terms of length and the storyline was "a bit lost." Anderson didn't want to direct a mimicry of Alien, so he gave the script a major rewrite, picturing a "classic haunted house movie." He incorporated significant influences of moderately successful horror films such as Robert Wise's The Haunting (1963) and Kubrick's The Shining (1980), because they created suspense from the unknown—the evil presence was hidden from the viewer—and their endings induced ambiguities of perception in the audience. He said he was also interested in the concept of Hell, and of "the ship itself being possessed rather than going 'Oh, it's an alien consciousness that is doing this,'" and added these to the script. Anderson also said that the science fiction film Solaris (1972) was inspiration for Event Horizon.

Screenwriter Philip Eisner acknowledged that Warhammer 40,000 influenced the story. In the setting of Warhammer 40,000, spaceships travel the galaxy by passing through "the Warp"—a parallel dimension where faster-than-light travel is possible, conceptually similar to "hyperspace" in Star Wars—but which is also inhabited by evil spirits that can infiltrate the ship and possess the crew if said ship isn't properly shielded. Fans consider Event Horizon to be an unofficial prequel to Warhammer 40,000, when humankind discovers the Warp and learns of its dangers the hard way.

Filming and effects
Filming took place in Pinewood Studios. Anderson modeled the Event Horizon ship after Notre Dame Cathedral using an architectural cam program. Effects supervisors Richard Yuricich and Neil Corbould kept most visuals in-camera, and moving sets were constructed for the gyrosphere gravity drive and the revolving tunnel. For scenes depicting zero gravity, the actors were hung upside down in harnesses and spun around. The original script had more zero gravity scenes, but budget constraints had the filmmakers introduce magnetic boots. Because the majority of scenes were filmed in a studio on gothic-inspired sets, Anderson felt the cast experienced a kind of "cabin fever" that better served their performances.

Editing
As Anderson explained, directors usually have a standard 10-week editing period to produce a film's first cut, as guaranteed by the Directors Guild of America. However, due to the short production schedule, the rapidly approaching release date, and the fact that principal photography had not finished, Anderson agreed to a six-week editing period, and promised to deliver the film by August 1997, as Paramount wanted a hit film before Titanic's planned September release date. When the main unit wrapped, Anderson was supposed to start editing the film, but he had two weeks of shooting left with the second unit, shortening post-production to just four weeks, during which only a rough cut could be assembled. He noted that at two hours and 10 minutes, it was overly long, with weak direction and acting that could have used another editing pass; unfinished special effects; and a poor sound mix.

In test screenings, the cut was poorly received. There were complaints about the extreme gore, and Anderson and producer Jeremy Bolt claim that some members of the test audience fainted. Paramount executives, who had stopped watching the dailies before any of the gore was shot, and were seeing the complete film for the first time along with the audience, were similarly shocked by how gruesome it was, and demanded a shorter runtime with less gore. Anderson agreed that while his first cut was too long, Paramount forced him to make one that was instead too short, and that the film would benefit by the restoration of around 10 minutes of footage, including some of the deleted gore.

Lost footage

When the initial DVD release was a surprise hit, the studio and Anderson became interested in assembling a director's cut, but found that the excised footage had not been carefully stored and much of it had gone missing. The director's cut was abandoned and instead a special-edition two-DVD set was released, featuring one deleted scene, two extended scenes, and a few shots of deleted material in the included making-of featurette. The footage is of "video" quality.

Known deleted scenes include a meeting scene between Weir and people in charge of the mission in which they discuss Event Horizon, some dialogue of which remained present in the theatrical trailer; more backstory for Cooper and Justin, including a stronger explanation for Justin entering the black hole; a deleted backstory of the relationship between Starck and Miller; additional scenes explaining what the gateway to hell/black hole is; Miller finding a tooth floating in Event Horizon; a longer version of the scene where Peters hallucinates that her son's mangled legs are covered in maggots; a scene where Weir hallucinates that Justin turns into his wife Claire; a bloodier version of Weir's wife Claire's suicide; a longer version of the scene where Miller finds D.J.'s vivisected body with his guts on the table; and a longer version of the "Visions From Hell" scene during Miller's final fight with Weir, with more shots of Event Horizon crew being tortured.

The "bloody orgy" video was also longer. As Anderson was sometimes too busy filming other scenes, second-unit director Vadim Jean filmed some parts of it. Real-life amputees were used for special effects scenes where Event Horizon crew members were mutilated, and pornographic film actors were hired to make the sex and rape scenes more realistic and graphic.

The film's final ending was a combination of two unused alternate endings. One did not have a jump scare at the end when the last two survivors are found by another rescue crew and Starck hallucinates that she sees Weir, although there was a similar version of the scene included in this ending where she hears screams of the Event Horizon crew and screams before Cooper wakes her. This was the film's original ending in the shooting script. The second ending had Miller fighting with the burned man from his visions at the core instead of with Weir, but this was changed due to the negative test screening.

In an Event Horizon Q&A in 2011, Anderson was asked when extra footage would be made available. "Never," he said, explaining that much of it was gone forever. However, in a 2012 interview, he announced that producer Lloyd Levin had found a VHS tape with his original rough cut. He said that after finishing Resident Evil: Retribution, he planned to watch the recovered footage for the first time since assembling the film. In a January 2017 interview, he reiterated that a director's cut would never be released, as the footage no longer existed. Asked about the VHS tape, he said neither he nor Levin had seen it yet, as Levin had moved to Spain; however, he was still excited about watching it at some point.

Music
Michael Kamen was hired to compose the film's score. Director Paul W. S. Anderson, a fan of hybrid genre music, invited the electronic dance music duo Orbital to collaborate with Kamen and to provide synthesized sounds for the film's unsettling atmosphere.

A soundtrack album was released which combined various cues from the score into four tracks of approximately ten minutes.

Reception

Box office
Event Horizon was released on August 15, 1997, and was a box office failure, grossing only $26,616,590 against a $60 million production budget in the United States. Internationally it grossed nearly $16 million, for a worldwide total of $42 million.

Critical response
On review aggregator Rotten Tomatoes, Event Horizon holds an approval rating of 32% based on 87 reviews and an average rating of 5/10. Its consensus reads, "Despite a strong opening that promises sci-fi thrills, Event Horizon quickly devolves into an exercise of style over substance whose flashy effects and gratuitous gore fail to mask its overreliance on horror clichés." On Metacritic, the film holds a weighted average score of 35 out of 100, based on 20 critics, indicating "generally unfavorable reviews". Audiences polled by CinemaScore gave the film an average grade of "D+" on an A+ to F scale.

Roger Ebert gave the film two out of four stars, commending its atmosphere and noting the opening portion as particularly well crafted; however, he felt it never managed to become the intense, thought-provoking experience it wanted to be. The Washington Post critic Stephen Hunter called the film "pointlessly loud", with more devotion to style rather than scares and a more satisfying explanation of its supernatural experiences. In a lukewarm review, Empire magazine wrote: "That the film never fulfils its promise is down to its over reliance on horror vagaries in a precision-built sci-fi milieu, ultimately leaving too many unanswered queries. A sharper script and a more credible solution could have turned this impressive hokum into a force to be reckoned with". Ebert and some other critics noted the influence of Tarkovsky's Solaris on  Event Horizon.

The film had some early supporters. Total Film gave it 3 out of 5, stating: "Excellent special effects and an Alien-esque feel make this supernatural horror film ('The Shining in space,' as most critics have called it, pretty accurately) well worth a look." Entertainment Weekly gave it a B−, stating, "Just when you've written off this deep-space nightmare as a late-summer melange of Alien, Fantastic Voyage, The Shining, and a dozen more forgettable otherworldly thrillers, it unleashes some of the most unsettling horror imagery in years", whereas Time Out magazine mentioned that "despite its shortcomings, this is never dull. The movie avoids Alien space monster clichés brilliantly and the soundtrack contains more of the 'Boo!' effects than I've heard since Halloween."

In the years since its release, the film has built a cult following and has been referenced in other works of popular culture. During its 25th anniversary release, Anderson said, "It's finally got the reaction now that I was hoping it would get 25 years ago."

Future

Potential films
In December 2011, Paul W.S. Anderson and Jeremy Bolt stated that there have been ongoing discussions equal in consideration and detail to explore additional movies that would expand the Event Horizon story, in the form of a prequel and a sequel. Potential stories to be developed include following the first crew aboard the Event Horizon and their mission that lead to their disappearance for seven years, as well as a continuation film detailing the events that followed the rescue of Lt. M.L. Starck, T.F. Cooper, and Ensign "Baby Bear" Justin. Later by October 2020 however after years of no development, the filmmaker stated that the reason he hadn't returned to the property in any continuation as he didn't want to take away from the experience of the original movie. In August 2022, Anderson reiterated that talk of a prequel and/or sequel is always ongoing, and stated that what has kept the projects from becoming a reality is his desire to preserve the original film's ambiguity.

Television series
In August 2019, a television series based on the film was reported to be in development by Paramount Television and Amazon Studios. Adam Wingard will direct the series, in addition to serving as executive producer alongside Larry Gordon, Lloyd Levin, and Jeremy Platt. Gordon and Levin previously held producer roles on the original feature film.

See also

 1997 in film
 List of incomplete or partially lost films
 List of films featuring space stations
 List of science fiction horror films

References

External links

 
 
 
Script of the movie on Scripts.com

1997 films
1997 horror films
1990s science fiction horror films
1990s supernatural horror films
1990s psychological horror films
British science fiction horror films
American science fiction horror films
1990s English-language films
Films scored by Michael Kamen
Films scored by Orbital (band)
Films about astronauts
Films directed by Paul W. S. Anderson
Films set in 2047
Films set in the future
Films set on spacecraft
Films shot at Pinewood Studios
Films about wormholes
Neptune in film
Films about parallel universes
Fiction set around Proxima Centauri
Paramount Pictures films
1990s American films
1990s British films